Jan Netopilík (24 November 1936 – 2 February 2022) was a Czechoslovak athlete. He competed in the men's long jump at the 1960 Summer Olympics. Later on, he moved to Bratislava, where he worked as an athletic trainer. Netopilík died in Bratislava on 2 February 2022, at the age of 85.

References

External links
 

1936 births
2022 deaths
Athletes (track and field) at the 1960 Summer Olympics
Czech male long jumpers
Olympic athletes of Czechoslovakia
People from Břeclav District
Sportspeople from the South Moravian Region